Wyoming Highway 153 (WYO 153) was a short  spur route of WYO 152 in central Goshen County, south of the town of Yoder and northwest of Hawk Springs.

Route description
Wyoming Highway 153 began its western end south of Yoder at Wyoming Highway 152 which travels west and north from here. WYO 153 only travelled just over a mile east before ending at Goshen County Route 133. WYO 153 lies north of Springer Reservoir.

Major intersections

References

Official 2003 State Highway Map of Wyoming

External links 

Wyoming State Routes 100-199
WYO 153 - WYO 152 to end

Transportation in Goshen County, Wyoming
153